Cosmin Alin Popescu (born March 19, 1974 in Babșa, Timiș County) is a Romanian environmental  scientist, University Professor and Rector of the Banat University of Agricultural Sciences and Veterinary Medicine. Professor Popescu was reelected on January 17, 2020 for another 4 years as rector.

Biography
After leaving school Popescu studies Natural Science at the Faculty of Agriculture, specialising in environmental engineering (1998–1997). In order to deepen his knowledge of the subject he then took an internship at the University of Rennes in France studying the application of satellites to agricultural technology. There followed further qualifications in Environmental Technology and Cadastral Studies at the West University of Timișoara  where he obtained a doctorate (Dr.-Ing.) and a post at the National Union of Realtors in Timișoara.

Popescu then returned to  the Faculty of agriculture  at Banat University with the Chair of Geodesy and Cadastry, and also as Visiting Professor at the Polytechnic University of Timișoara. He speaks Italian, French and English, and is a member of numerous professional bodies. He has expertise/experience in university administration, agricultural and environmental engineering, cadastre, urban planning. In February 2016, Popescu was elected rector of USABMT for a period of four years.

References

External links 
 Webpage of the USABTM Timisoara
 CV and Publicationlist of Cosmin Alin Popescu on the Webpage USABTM
Opinia Timisoarei. Rektorat of the USABTM Timisoara 
 Journal of Young Scientist: Mihau Herbei and Cosmin Alin Popescu, Analysis of the Timisoara Region by Satellite Images

1974 births
Living people
People from Timiș County
Romanian environmentalists
Academic staff of the Banat University of Agricultural Sciences and Veterinary Medicine
Romanian agronomists
Rectors of universities in Romania
Academic staff of the Politehnica University of Timișoara